Yartsevsky District is an administrative and municipal district (raion), one of the twenty-five in Smolensk Oblast, Russia. It is located in the central and northern parts of the oblast. Its administrative center is the town of Yartsevo. Population: 55,803 (2010 Census);  The population of Yartsevo accounts for 85.7% of the district's total population.

References

Notes

Sources

Districts of Smolensk Oblast